Colonel Robert Burton Leslie  (7 October 1891 – 12 July 1976) was the 8th Commander of the Ceylon Defence Force. He was appointed on 3 March 1935 until 12 May 1937. He was succeeded by Gordon Thorne.

He served in the Lincolnshire Regiment in World War I and was awarded an MC in the 1916 Birthday Honours.

References

British Army personnel of World War I
Commanders of the Ceylon Defence Force
Recipients of the Military Cross
Royal Lincolnshire Regiment officers
1891 births
1976 deaths
People from Cork (city)
British Army brigadiers of World War II
British people in British Ceylon